The Bahía Mansa Metamorphic Complex or BMMC, also known as the Western Series, is a group of metamorphic geologic formations of the Chilean Coast Range in southern Chile. It consists mainly of pelitic schists, metagreywackes and oceanic type mafic metavolcanics. The complex owes its name to Bahía Mansa.

References 

Lithodemic units of Chile
Geology of Araucanía Region
Geology of Biobío Region
Geology of Los Ríos Region
Geology of Los Lagos Region
Metamorphic complexes
Geology of the Chilean Coast Range
Coasts of Los Ríos Region
Coasts of Los Lagos Region